"The Reason Why" is a song by Italian singer-songwriter Lorenzo Fragola, released as his debut single on 5 December 2014, during the week preceding the final of the eight season of Italian talent show X Factor, which was won by Fragola himself.

The song was written by Fragola with Michelle Lily Popovic and Fausto Cogliati. The latter also served as the song's producer.

Background
Fragola started composing the song a few years before it was completed, during a summer holiday when some friends asked him to write a song as a joke while they played the guitar together. He later continued to work on the track, and he chose to perform it during the auditions for the eighth series of X Factor. On 4 December 2016, during the semi-final of the show, each contestant was required to perform a previously unreleased track, and Fragola chose to perform "The Reason Why". The following day, the song was released as a single, together with the other contestant's entries. "The Reason Why" later allowed Fragola to win the X Factor series, on 11 December 2014.

Writing for Italian magazine Panorama, Gianni Poglio described "The Reason Why", as a "pop song written to receive airplay, incisive, immediate, without being trivial". Critics including Alessandro Alicandri and la Repubblicas Anna Puricella also compared the song's sound to the work of British singer-songwriter Ed Sheeran.

Track listing
 Digital download'
 "The Reason Why" – 3:02

Charts

Certifications

Release history

References

2014 songs
2014 debut singles
English-language Italian songs
Italian songs
Number-one singles in Italy
X Factor (Italian TV series)